Paloma Faith Blomfield (born 21 July 1981) is an English singer and actress. Her debut studio album, Do You Want the Truth or Something Beautiful?, was released in 2009 and was certified double platinum in the UK. The album spawned the singles "Stone Cold Sober", "New York", and "Upside Down", and earned Faith her first BRIT Award nomination in 2010.

In 2012, Faith released her second studio album, Fall to Grace, which charted at number two on the UK Albums Chart and earned her a double platinum certification. The album produced her first top ten single, "Picking Up the Pieces", the top twenty cover version of INXS's "Never Tear Us Apart", and earned her two BRIT Award nominations. In 2014, Faith released her third studio album, A Perfect Contradiction, which stands as her most successful album to date, also receiving a double platinum certification. The album spawned the hit singles "Can't Rely on You" and "Only Love Can Hurt Like This", with the latter also topping the charts in Australia. Her fourth studio album, The Architect, was released in 2017 and debuted at number one in the UK, becoming Faith's first number-one album. In 2020, she released her fifth studio album, Infinite Things.

In addition to her solo work, Faith collaborated with the duo Sigma on the 2014 single "Changing", which charted at number one in the UK, and DJ Sigala on "Lullaby", which reached the top ten in 2018. As an actress, she has appeared in St Trinian's (2007), The Imaginarium of Doctor Parnassus (2009), Dread (2009), Youth (2015), and Pennyworth (2019–present). Faith was a judge on the fifth series of The Voice UK in 2016, and on The Voice Kids in 2020.

Early life
Paloma Faith Blomfield was born in the Hackney area of London on 21 July 1981, the daughter of an English mother and Spanish father. Both of her parents were raised in Norfolk. Her parents separated when she was two years old and divorced two years later. She was raised by her mother in Stoke Newington, although she maintains a close relationship with her paternal grandmother. As a child, she took ballet classes in Dalston. After completing her A-levels at City and Islington College, she went on to study for a degree in contemporary dance at the Northern School of Contemporary Dance in Leeds, while working as a hip-hop dancer at the nightclub LoveDough. She then studied for an MA in theatre directing at Central Saint Martins College of Art and Design and took various part-time jobs as a sales assistant at Agent Provocateur, a singer in a burlesque cabaret, a bartender, a life model, and a magician's assistant.

Music career

2007–2008: Career beginnings 
Faith's first foray into music began when she mimicked famous soul and jazz singers including Etta James and Billie Holiday, whom she admires and cites as influences for her own work. She met her managers Jamie Binns and Christian Wåhlberg of Lateral Management in 2007. Binns had been tipped off by the producer Peanut, a client who had recently worked with Faith in his studio and been impressed. He met up with Faith shortly afterwards and was "completely blown away", later saying, "I wasn't sure what this girl was going to do – she was an actress and a singer – but there was just something about her in that artistic realness that when I came out of the meeting I called Christian and said, 'We have to do something with this girl!

During her time at college, Faith worked in a pub where the manager asked her to front his band, which they later called Paloma and the Penetrators. During a performance with the band at a cabaret show, she was scouted by an A&R man from Epic Records, who invited her to sing for the manager of the label. 20 minutes into the audition, she asked the manager to turn his phone off; when he refused, she walked out. The manager later called her and offered her a contract, claiming that he had seen many acts since their meeting but none had been as memorable as her. She turned down an opportunity to join Amy Winehouse's band in order to write and perform her own songs. Her first recognised work was the song "It's Christmas (and I Hate You)", which she recorded as a duet with Josh Weller in 2008.

2009–2013: Do You Want the Truth or Something Beautiful? and Fall to Grace 

In June 2009, Faith released her debut single "Stone Cold Sober", which reached number 17 on the UK Singles Chart. Her second single, "New York", was released in September 2009, charting at number 15 in the UK. It was later re-released as an updated version featuring rapper Ghostface Killah. In September 2009, she released her debut album, Do You Want the Truth or Something Beautiful?, for which she wrote or co-wrote all of the songs in the UK, Sweden and America. It debuted at number 14 on the UK Albums Chart and later peaked at number nine, remaining in the chart for 16 weeks. and becoming BBC Radio 2's "Album of the Week" from 19 September 2009. She released her third single, the album's title track in December 2009. The song peaked at number 64 in the UK. In the same year, Faith appeared as a vocalist on Basement Jaxx's Scars album and American hip-hop artist MF Doom's album, Born Like This.

In March 2010, Faith released her fourth single "Upside Down", which reached number 55 in the UK. To promote the album, she embarked on her first headlining tour of the UK and Ireland commencing in March. The Times described the tour as being "full of theatrical artifice, but based on the rock-solid foundation of [Faith]'s sensational singing voice and a personality that sparkled like a rough diamond". She performed a live set for the BBC's Radio 2 Introduces... and gave an interview to host Dermot O'Leary. Faith performed at numerous festivals throughout that summer, including T4 on the Beach, the Cheltenham Jazz Festival and the 2010 iTunes Festival. In May 2010, Faith featured on the theme song "Keep Moving" to the 2010 British film 4.3.2.1, alongside Adam Deacon and Bashy. In October 2010, Faith released "Smoke & Mirrors" as the final single from her debut album.

In January 2011, Faith was nominated for British Female Solo Artist at the 2011 BRIT Awards, where she also performed "Forget You" alongside Cee Lo Green. She appeared on the charity single "Hard Times" with Plan B and Elton John in May 2011. In May 2012, Faith released her second studio album Fall to Grace. She enlisted record producers Nellee Hooper and Jake Gosling to work with her on the project. The album charted at number two on the UK Albums Chart. The album's first single "Picking Up the Pieces" reached number seven on the UK Singles Chart, becoming Faith's first top ten single. In May 2012, Faith joined The Voice UK as one of four guest mentors. She worked with coach Danny O'Donoghue during the battle rounds phase of the competition and also performed "Picking Up the Pieces" during the results show.

In August 2012, Faith released "30 Minute Love Affair" as the second single from Fall to Grace. She recorded a version of INXS's "Never Tear Us Apart" for a John Lewis advertisement, which began airing on television from September 2012. It was later included on the album as a single. Faith released "Just Be" as the fourth single from the album on in December 2012. She performed the track on Later... with Jools Holland. In early 2013, Faith embarked on a headline UK and Ireland tour in support of the album. She received two nominations at the 2013 BRIT Awards; for Best Female and for Best British Album for Fall to Grace. The album has been certified double platinum by the British Phonographic Industry for sales in excess of 700,000 copies.

2014–2019: A Perfect Contradiction and The Architect 

In January 2013, Faith revealed that she had begun to write her third studio album during her time in the US. Later that year, she headlined the Evolution Festival in Newcastle upon Tyne. In March 2014, Faith's third album A Perfect Contradiction was released. It became her fastest-selling album to date, debuting at number two in the UK and receiving a double platinum certification. The lead single "Can't Rely on You" produced by Pharrell Williams, became her second top ten in the UK. The album's second single "Only Love Can Hurt Like This", written by Diane Warren, became her most successful single to date, reaching number six in the UK, number one in Australia and number three in New Zealand. After the success of the single, the album reached a new peak of number four in Australia. The album's third single, "Trouble with My Baby" was released in August 2014.

In September 2014, British drum and bass duo "Sigma" released their single "Changing", featuring vocals from Faith. It debuted at number one in the UK, becoming her first UK number one single. In November 2014, a repackaged "Outsider's Edition" of her third album was released featuring four new songs including the single "Ready for the Good Life". The same month, Faith joined the charity group Band Aid 30 along with other British and Irish pop acts, recording a new version of the track "Do They Know It's Christmas?" to raise money for the 2014 Ebola crisis in West Africa. At the 2015 Brit Awards, Faith won the award for British Female Solo Artist, becoming her first win.

In June 2015, Faith confirmed that she had started the process of creating her fourth studio album. She made reference to Jimi Hendrix and Janis Joplin as inspirations for the record. In August 2015, it was announced that Faith would become a coach on The Voice UK. As well as her role on the show, Faith launched her own management and publishing company.

In August 2017, Faith returned with the lead single "Crybaby" from her fourth album entitled The Architect. The album was later released in November, debuting at number one on the UK Albums Chart, becoming Faith's first UK chart-topping album. Three further singles from the album have been released: "Guilty", "'Til I'm Done" and "Warrior". In February 2018, Faith released a collaboration with DJ Sigala, "Lullaby" which charted at number six in the UK, becoming her fourth top ten single as a lead artist and fifth overall. The following month, Faith covered the 1960s song "Make Your Own Kind of Music" by Mama Cass. It featured in a TV commercial by Škoda which was heavily played throughout the year, causing the track to chart at number 28 in the UK. In November 2018, Faith released a re-issue "Zeitgeist Edition" of The Architect, featuring six new songs including "Make Your Own Kind of Music", "Lullaby" and "Loyal".

2020: Infinite Things 
In 2020, Faith reprised her role as a coach on The Voice UKs children's counterpart,  The Voice Kids for its fourth series. In August 2020, the title of her fifth studio album was announced as Infinite Things.

Television and film career 
In 2007, Faith appeared in an episode of the BBC police drama HolbyBlue portraying a thief. She was also cast as Andrea in St Trinian's in 2007. Faith was also cast in Terry Gilliam's The Imaginarium of Doctor Parnassus as Sally, the girlfriend of the Devil (played by Tom Waits) in 2009. She also appeared in the horror film Dread as Clara Thornhill. She later starred in the Channel 4 series Coming Up and the short film A Nice Touch. Of getting the part, she stated "I don't think they even knew I was an actress. I went to an audition and they said that they liked my interpretation of the character and I said, 'I'm just being myself'." In 2013, she appeared as cabaret performer Georgia, in a television adaptation of P. G. Wodehouse's Blandings (episode "The Crime Wave at Blandings") on the BBC. In 2015 she appeared as herself in Paolo Sorrentino's Youth. Later that year, Faith also appeared as Tinker Bell in the TV film Peter & Wendy, based on J. M. Barrie's novel Peter Pan.

In 2016, Faith became a judge on The Voice UK. She remained on the panel for one series, owing to her pregnancy. In 2017, Faith sang with Grace Davies' on Grace's original song, "Roots", on "The X Factor". In 2018, Faith was cast as  the lead villainess in the Epix series Pennyworth, a Batman prequel. She also voices Portia the goth poodle on 101 Dalmatian Street.

Artistry 
Faith is known for her retro and eccentric style. She is a mezzo-soprano. Her music often blends soul and elements of jazz and gospel; she has been consequently compared to Amy Winehouse, Adele and Duffy.

Personal life 
During an episode of The Voice UK, Faith claimed she once read an article that called music artist KT Tunstall old despite being only 27 at the time. As she was 27 herself at the time, Faith felt pressure to lie about her age when trying to acquire a record deal, and claimed to be 23. She later admitted to lying about her age, claiming, "I want to be judged for my music, not my age" and would frequently change her age on Wikipedia until a fan provided her birth certificate.

Faith married New Zealand chef Rian Haynes in 2005, though they separated after eight months and were divorced in 2009. She later said of the marriage, "It was just a young, frivolous thing. We were in our early twenties and we did something quickly and realised it was a mistake. But we're still close. I am still friends with him. All my other relationships were the ones that screwed me up, not that one!"

In August 2016, it was revealed that Faith was expecting her first child with long-term boyfriend Leyman Lahcine. She gave birth to a daughter in December 2016, married Lahcine in 2017 and gave birth to a second daughter in February 2021.

Discography 

 Do You Want the Truth or Something Beautiful? (2009)
 Fall to Grace (2012)
 A Perfect Contradiction (2014)
 The Architect (2017)
 Infinite Things (2020)

Filmography

Film

Television

Tours 
Do You Want the Truth or Something Beautiful Tour (2010)
Fall to Grace Tour (2012–13)
Paloma Faith Tour (2014–15)
The Architect Tour  (2018)
The Infinite Things Tour (2021)
The Age of Optimism Tour (2022)

Awards and nominations

References

External links

Paloma Faith portrait competition at BBC Blast

1981 births
Living people
English mezzo-sopranos
English soul singers
English women singer-songwriters
English jazz singers
English cabaret pianists
English film actresses
English people of Spanish descent
English female dancers
English rock singers
English women pop singers
People from Hackney Central
Alumni of City and Islington College
Alumni of Central Saint Martins
People from Stoke Newington
English television actresses
Age controversies
Salespeople
British burlesque performers
Epic Records artists
RCA Records artists
Sony Music UK artists
Women rock singers
Singers from London
Third British Invasion artists
Brit Award winners
21st-century English actresses
21st-century English women singers
21st-century English singers
Musicians with dyslexia
Actors with dyslexia
21st-century women pianists